Events in the year 1988 in Germany.

Incumbents

West Germany
President - Richard von Weizsäcker
Chancellor – Helmut Kohl

East Germany
Head of State – Erich Honecker
Head of Government – Willi Stoph

Events 
 12 - 23 February - 38th Berlin International Film Festival
 31 March - Germany in the Eurovision Song Contest 1988
 28 August – Ramstein air show disaster
 7 October - East German Republic Day Parade of 1988

Births

18 January - Angelique Kerber, German tennis player
20 January - Benjamin Ulrich, German rugby player
29 February - Benedikt Höwedes, German football player
2 March - Simon Terodde, German football player
12 March - Sebastian Brendel, German sprint canoeist
14 March - Rico Freimuth, German athlete
12 April - Lisa Unruh, German archer
29 April - Julian Reus, German athlete
8 June - Lisa Brennauer, German cyclist
19 July - Kevin Großkreutz, German football player
3 September - Jérôme Boateng, German football player
9 September - Fiona Erdmann, German model
3 October - Max Giesinger, German singer
5 October - Bahar Kızıl, German singer-songwriter
15 October - Mesut Özil, football player
1 December - Nadia Hilker, German actress and model
16 December - Mats Hummels, German football player

Deaths

 20 January - Paul Esser, German actor (born 1913)
 21 January - Werner Nachmann, President of Central Council of Jews in Germany (born 1925)
 28 January - Klaus Fuchs, physicist and spy (born 1911)
 9 March - Kurt Georg Kiesinger, German politician (born 1904)
 9 May - Georg Moser, German bishop of Roman Catholic Church (born 1923)
 27 May - Ernst Ruska, German physicist who won the Nobel Prize in Physics (born 1906)
 20 July — Richard Holm, German operatic tenor (born 1912)
 27 July - Brigitte Horney, German actress (born 1911)
 5 September - Gert Fröbe, German actor (born 1913)
 6 September - Axel von Ambesser, German actor and film director (born 1910)
 3 October - Franz Josef Strauss, German politician (born 1915)
 9 October - Felix Wankel, German engineer (born 1902)
 14 October - Charles Augustus, Hereditary Grand Duke of Saxe-Weimar-Eisenach (born 1912)
 20 December — Anni Schaad, German jewelry maker (born 1911)

See also
1988 in German television

References

 
Years of the 20th century in Germany
1980s in Germany
Germany
Germany